Fly With Me (Traditional Chinese: 飛女正傳) is a TVB modern comedy-action series.

Synopsis
Leung Hau-Chi or Yvonne (Ada Choi) is a typical career woman in her 30s - fussy, arrogant and easily irritated by the sight of beautiful young women.  Desperate for love and for something exciting to happen in her life, Chi is miserable and begins to despair when she abruptly transforms into a superwoman of incredible charm and strength.

With each new amazing power, Chi uses her extraordinary powers to fight for justice, help the weak, and go on remarkable adventures.  On the way, she meets three kindhearted men: Yeung Ho-Yin (Kenny Wong), a brave but traditional policeman; Tsu Wing-Fai (Raymond Cho), a good-natured self-made businessman; and Kan Ming-Hin (Moses Chan), a genius plastic surgeon.  To complicate matters, Hin happens to be in love with both Chi and her superwoman alter ego.  Despite having superpowers, Chi has no idea how to find her true love.

Cast

Awards and nominations
TVB Anniversary Awards (2010)
 Nominated - Best Drama
 Nominated - Best Actress (Ada Choi)
 Nominated - Best Supporting Actor (Kenny Wong)
 Nominated - Best Supporting Actor (Raymond Cho)
 Nominated - Best Supporting Actress (Queenie Chu)
 Nominated - My Favourite Female Character (Ada Choi)

Viewership ratings

References

External links
TVB.com Fly with Me - Official Website 

TVB dramas
2010 Hong Kong television series debuts
2010 Hong Kong television series endings